Qapanlı may refer to:
 Qapanlı, Shamkir, Azerbaijan
 Qapanlı, Tartar
 Yuxarı Qapanlı, Azerbaijan
 Aşağı Qapanlı, Azerbaijan
 Alışarlı, Azerbaijan
Kapanly, Azerbaijan